Javier Beirán Amigo (born 22 May 1987) is a Spanish professional basketball player for Movistar Estudiantes of the Spanish LEB Oro . Beirán usually plays as small forward.

Professional career
On 30 April 2017 Beirán won the Basketball Champions League with Tenerife.

On 4 July 2018 Beirán re-signed with Iberostar Tenerife until 2020.

On 28 June 2019 Beirán returned to Herbalife Gran Canaria.

International career
Beirán played for the U20 Spain national team.

Personal life
Javier Beirán is son of José Manuel Beirán, basketball player who won the silver medal at the 1984 Summer Olympics and the 1979–80 FIBA European Champions Cup with Real Madrid.

References

1987 births
Living people
2019 FIBA Basketball World Cup players
CB Canarias players
CB Estudiantes players
CB Gran Canaria players
Liga ACB players
Small forwards
Spanish men's basketball players
Basketball players from Madrid
FIBA Basketball World Cup-winning players